Anparafaravola District is a district in the Alaotra-Mangoro region in Madagascar. Its capital is Amparafaravola.

Communes
The district is further divided into 21 communes:

 Ambatomainty
 Amboavory
 Ambodimanga
 Ambohijanahary
 Ambohimandroso
 Ambohitrarivo
 Ampasikely
 Amparafaravola
 Andilana Nord
 Andrebakely Nord
 Andrebakely Sud
 Andromba
 Anororo
 Beanana
 Bedidy
 Morarano Chrome
 Ranomainty
 Sahamamy
 Tanambe
 Vohimena
 Vohitsara

References

Districts of Alaotra-Mangoro